Cyclommatus canaliculatus is a species of beetles belonging to the family Lucanidae.

Description
The basic colour is dark red-brown or blackish. The mandibles are long and their outer margin is straight, while their inner margins are armed at about one third of its length with a strong tooth. The mandibles are finely granulated and sub-opaque, but the apical portion is glossy. The upper side of the head shows a large flattened depression. The sides of the prothorax have an angular tooth. The elytra are covered with punctures.

Distribution
This species can be found in Malaysia, Borneo, Java and Nias (Indonesia).

Subspecies 
 Cyclommatus canaliculatus canaliculatus Ritsema, 1891
 Cyclommatus canaliculatus consanguineus Boileu, 1898
 Cyclommatus canaliculatus freygessneri Ritsema, 1892
 Cyclommatus canaliculatus infans de Lisle, 1970

References
 Zipcodezoo
 Biolib
 Synopsis of the described Coleoptera of the World
 Notes from the Leyden Museum

External links
 Cyclommatus canaliculatus
 Beetlespace

Lucaninae
Beetles described in 1891